Ruff Rhymes: Greatest Hits Collection is a greatest hits album by West Coast hip hop artist King Tee. It was released by Capitol Records in 1998, three years after King Tee's last album. It contains tracks from each of King Tee's first three albums, all of which were released by Capitol Records. It contains no tracks from Tee's fourth album, IV Life, which was released on MCA Records. King Tee was dropped by Capitol before this album's release so he had no say in which tracks would be put on it. Only three tracks on this compilation, "Bass", "Ya Better Bring a Gun", and "Can This Be Real?", are not on any of King Tee's other albums. The compilation's name is a reference to King Tee's most successful charting song, "Ruff Rhyme (Back Again)".

Track listing

References

1998 greatest hits albums
King Tee albums
Albums produced by Marley Marl
Albums produced by DJ Pooh